Cat eye syndrome (CES) or Schmid–Fraccaro syndrome is a rare condition caused by an abnormal extra chromosome, i.e. a small supernumerary marker chromosome. This chromosome consists of the entire short arm and a small section of the long arm of chromosome 22. In consequence, individuals with the cat eye syndrome have three (trisomic) or four (tetrasomic) copies of the genetic material contained in the abnormal chromosome instead of the normal two copies. The prognosis for patients with CES varies depending on the severity of the condition and their associated signs and symptoms, especially when  heart or kidney abnormalities are seen.

Signs and symptoms
 Unilateral or bilateral iris coloboma (absence of tissue from the colored part of the eyes)
 Preauricular pits/tags (small depressions/growths of skin on the outer ears)

 Anal atresia (abnormal obstruction of the anus)
 Downward-slanting palpebral fissures (openings between the upper and lower eyelids)
 Cleft palate
 Kidney problems (missing, extra, or underdeveloped kidneys)
 Short stature
 Scoliosis/skeletal problems
 Cardiac defects (such as TAPVR)
 Micrognathia (smaller jaw)
 Hernias
 Biliary atresia
 Rarer malformations can affect almost any organ
 Intellectual disability – many are intellectually normal; about 30% of CES patients have moderately impaired mental development, although severe intellectual disability is rare.

The term "cat eye" syndrome was coined because of the particular appearance of the vertical colobomas in the eyes of some patients, but over half of the CES patients in the literature do not present with this trait.

Genetics
The small supernumerary marker chromosome (sSMC) in CES usually arises spontaneously. It may be hereditary and parents may be mosaic for the marker chromosome, but show no phenotypic symptoms of the syndrome. This sSMC may be small, large, or ring-shaped, and typically includes 2 Mb, i.e. 2 million DNA base pairs, termed the CES critical region, located on its q arm(s) between its band 11 and terminus (area notated as 22pter→q11)(also see small supernumerary marker chromosomes in cat eye syndrome). This area contains the CECR1, SLC25A18, and ATP6V1E1 genes which are strong candidate genes for causing or promoting at least some of the birth defects in CES.

Diagnosis

History
The abnormalities common to CES were first cataloged in 1899, and described in association with a small marker chromosome in 1965. Early reports of CES discuss the possibility of chromosome 13 involvement. Now, CES is considered to be present with the chromosome 22 trisomy findings.

See also
 Trisomy 22

References

External links 

Congenital disorders
Syndromes affecting stature
Syndromes affecting the jaw
Syndromes affecting the heart
Syndromes affecting the kidneys
Syndromes with cleft lip and/or palate
Syndromes affecting the eye
Rare syndromes